Tanuja Desai Hidier is an Indian-American author and singer/songwriter. She is best known for her 2002 young adult novel Born Confused, and its 2014 sequel Bombay Blues.

Life
Hidier was born in Wilbraham, Massachusetts. Her parents met in when they were both attending medical school in Parel (South Mumbai). Their marriage was intercaste and scandalous for her father's family, though her mother's family accepted the marriage. This marriage was a basis for the parents' marriage in Born Confused.

She graduated from Brown University.

She collaborates with Atom Fellows, in the group T&A.

She lives in London.

Writing career 
Her first novel, Born Confused, was released in 2002. The story is a coming-of-age story about an Indian-American teenager named Dimple Lala, and is drawn "largely from autobiography." It is considered to be the first of its kind, a South Asian American novel with an Indian-American protagonist.

Musical career 
Hidier wrote and released two "booktracks" to accompany her books; When We Were Twins for Born Confused was released in 2004, and Bombay Spleen followed Bombay Blues in 2014.

Works
Born Confused, Scholastic Press, 2003,   

Tvära kast, Translated by Tony Manieri, Peder Carlsson, Publisher Damm, 2005,  
Tale of a Two-Hearted Tiger

 Bombay Blues, Scholastic Press, 2014

Films
 The Test (wrote and directed) 
 The Assimilation Alphabet (co-wrote and co-directed)

Awards 
Hidier is a recipient of the 1995 James Jones Literary Prize for her un-released novelTale of a Two-Hearted Tiger, and received an award for the YALSA 2003 Best Books for Young Adults for her 2002 novel Born Confused. She received the 2015 South Asia Book Award for Bombay Blues.

References

External links
official website
People aren't as far away as they seem, Push Voices
Confusion into Creativity: A Review of Born Confused and a Conversation with Tanuja Desai Hidier, Bookslut

Tanuja Desai Hidier Sampler 2013

Living people
Brown University alumni
21st-century American women writers
People from Wilbraham, Massachusetts
Year of birth missing (living people)
21st-century American novelists
American women novelists
Women writers of young adult literature
American writers of young adult literature
Novelists from Massachusetts